Ohio's 8th congressional district sits on the west side of Ohio, bordering Indiana. The cities of Hamilton, Fairfield, Middletown, Springfield, Eaton, Greenville, Piqua, and Troy are part of the district.  The district was represented by Republican John Boehner, the 53rd Speaker of the United States House of Representatives. On September 25, 2015, Boehner announced his resignation from the speakership and retirement from Congress, which became effective on October 31, 2015.

The current representative for this district is Republican Warren Davidson, who defeated Democrat Corey Foister and Green Party candidate James J. Condit Jr. in the 2016 special election to fill Boehner's seat.

Election results from presidential races

List of members representing the district

Recent election results

Historical district boundaries

See also
Ohio's congressional districts
List of United States congressional districts

References
Specific

General
 
 
 Congressional Biographical Directory of the United States 1774–present

08
Constituencies established in 1823
1823 establishments in Ohio